The 2015–16 season was Manchester City Football Club's 114th season of competitive football, 87th season in the top flight of English football and 19th season in the Premier League. Along with the league, the club also competed in the UEFA Champions League, FA Cup and League Cup. The season covered the period from 1 July 2015 to 30 June 2016.

In Manuel Pellegrini's final season at City, the club achieved some prominent milestones. On 28 February 2016, the Blues won the League Cup after beating Liverpool on penalties in the final at Wembley. Although City ended up only fourth in the league (which still qualified them for the following season's Champions League) despite a strong start, the season witnessed Manchester City's most successful European campaign to date, with the Blues defeating PSG 3–2 on aggregate to advance to the Champions League semi-finals for the first time in their history (they had never reached even the quarter-finals before). There, City were narrowly beaten by future champions Real Madrid 0–1 on aggregate.

Kits
Supplier: Nike / Sponsor: Etihad Airways

Kit information
The club entered the season being in the third year of a deal with the American manufacturer Nike.
Home: The new home kit features the traditional colours of sky blue and white. The kit sees a return to white details, which were ditched last season in favour of navy applications. The shirt has a white polo neck collar and cuffs, along with a white stripe running from the bottom of the sleeves to the sides of the shirt. White shorts are returned to the kit, which is combined with sky blue socks with a white turnover.
Away: The away kit is predominantly navy for the second season running, but this time the strip is combined with 'Chlorine Blue' detailing on the crew neck and the cuffs. The arms, however, feature a striking graphic of the Blue Moon, inspired by the song sung by the club's fans at the match days. The shirt is combined with navy shorts and socks.
Third: The third kit is mainly a shade of chartreuse, known as 'ghost green', with black gradient graphic at the base of the sleeves and the bottom of the shorts. The yellowish green colour of the kit was inspired by the yellow and navy striped away kit worn by the club in the 1999 play-off final, when Manchester City overcame a two-goal deficit to take the game to extra time and eventually win on penalties. The kit is based on Nike's new premium template, which is also worn by other major clubs.
Keeper: A new set of goalkeeper strips were released by Nike to be worn in the 2015–16 campaign. The first-choice strip is dark purple with lighter bluish line gradient on the arms, whilst the alternatives were yellow and green with a similar toned line gradient on the arms.

Pre-season
Manchester City visited Australia during pre-season, where they played local clubs Adelaide United and Melbourne City before facing Roma and Real Madrid, runners-up in the Italian and Spanish leagues respectively, in the 2015 International Champions Cup tournament. They also played matches against Vietnam national team and German Bundesliga team VfB Stuttgart.

Friendlies

2015 International Champions Cup

Friendlies

Competitions

Overall

Premier League

League table

Results summary

Results by matchday

Matches
On 17 June 2015, the fixtures for the forthcoming season were announced.

FA Cup

League Cup

UEFA Champions League

Group stage

The group stage draw was conducted on 27 August 2015 in Monaco, with City being paired with Juventus, Sevilla and Borussia Mönchengladbach.

Round of 16

Quarter-finals

Semi-finals

Squad information

First team squad

 
Ordered by squad number.Appearances include all competitive league and cup appearances, including as substitute.

Playing statistics

Appearances (Apps) numbers are for appearances in competitive games only, including as substitute.
Red card numbers denote: numbers in parentheses represent red cards overturned for wrongful dismissal.

Goalscorers
Includes all competitive matches. The list is sorted alphabetically by surname when total goals are equal.
Correct as of 15 May 2016

Clean sheets
Includes all competitive matches. The list is sorted alphabetically by surname when total clean sheets are equal.
Correct as of 15 May 2016

Awards

Premier League Manager of the Month award
Awarded monthly to the manager who was chosen by a panel assembled by the Premier League's sponsor.

Premier League Player of the Month award
Awarded monthly to the player who was chosen by a panel assembled by the Premier League's sponsor.

Etihad Player of the Month awards
Awarded to the player that receives the most votes in a poll conducted each month on the official website of Manchester City.

Transfers and loans

Transfers in

Total spending:  £150,000,000

Transfers out

Total earnings:  £47,900,000

Loans out

References

2015–16
Manchester City
Manchester City